Petalura pulcherrima is a species of Australian dragonfly in the family Petaluridae, 
commonly known as a beautiful petaltail. 
It is a very large and slender dragonfly, mostly black or dark brown with yellow markings and its eyes widely separated on top of its head. It has clear wings and a very long, narrow pterostigma.

Petalura pulcherrima is endemic to coastal rainforests and monsoon-forest streams of Cape York in Queensland, Australia.
Like other species of the genus Petalura, its larvae live in burrows beside rainforest streams, with an opening above water level.

Petalura pulcherrima appears similar to Petalura ingentissima which is larger still and is also found in coastal north-eastern Queensland.

Petalura pulcherrima is rarely seen. The IUCN Red List considers it to be a vulnerable species, with fragmentation of its habitat by human interference a major factor.

See also
 List of Odonata species of Australia

References

Petaluridae
Odonata of Australia
Insects of Australia
Endemic fauna of Australia
Endangered fauna of Australia
Taxa named by Robert John Tillyard
Insects described in 1913
Taxonomy articles created by Polbot